Meyhem Lauren (born May 14, 1983) is an American rapper from Queens, New York. He is a founding member of the Smart Crew collective. He has collaborated with the likes of DJ Muggs, Alchemist, and Harry Fraud. He stars in Fuck, That's Delicious with Action Bronson, Alchemist, and Big Body Bes.

Career
In 2007, Meyhem Lauren released a collaborative album with J-Love, titled Acknowledge Greatness. In 2010, he released "Got the Fever", a tribute song to graffiti culture. It was included on Complexs "25 Best Songs About Graffiti" list in 2012. The music video for the song has received a million views on YouTube.

Meyhem Lauren's debut solo album, titled Self Induced Illness, was released in 2011. In 2012, he released Respect the Fly Shit. It was included on Spins "40 Best Hip-Hop Albums of 2012" list. In that year, he also released Mandatory Brunch Meetings. In 2014, he released a collaborative album with Buckwild, titled Silk Pyramids. It was included on The Village Voices "10 Best New York City Rap Albums of 2014" list. In 2016, he released Piatto D'oro. In 2017, he released a collaborative album with DJ Muggs, titled Gems from the Equinox. In 2018, he released Glass, which was entirely produced by Harry Fraud. In 2022, he released a collaborative album with Daringer, titled Black Vladimir.

Discography

Studio albums
 Acknowledge Greatness (2007) 
 Self Induced Illness (2011)
 Respect the Fly Shit (2012)
 Mandatory Brunch Meetings (2012)
 Silk Pyramids (2014) 
 Piatto D'oro (2016)
 Gems from the Equinox (2017) 
 Black Vladimir (2022)

EPs
 Raw Cashmere (2013)
 More Cashmere (2015)
 Frozen Angels (2018) 
 Glass (2018) 
 Extra Glass (2018)
 Nickel Plated Wordplay (2019)
 Members Only (2019) 
 Glass 2.0 (2020)

Singles
 "Got the Fever" (2010)
 "Money in My Pocket" (2015)
 "Badmon Ting" (2016)
 "Still Playing Celo" (2019)

Filmography

Television series
 Fuck, That's Delicious (2016–present)

References

External links
 
 
 

Living people
1983 births
African-American male rappers
People from Queens, New York
Rappers from New York City
American male rappers
21st-century African-American people
20th-century African-American people